Leonard Buczkowski (5 August 1900 – 19 February 1967) was a Polish film director and screenwriter. He directed 23 films between 1928 and 1966. His 1959 film The Eagle was entered into the 1st Moscow International Film Festival.

Selected filmography
 Gwiaździsta eskadra (1930)
 Rapsodia Bałtyku (1935)
 Wierna rzeka (1936)
 Zakazane piosenki (1946)
 Sprawa pilota Maresza (1956)
 The Eagle (1959)

References

External links

1900 births
1967 deaths
Film people from Warsaw
People from Warsaw Governorate
Polish film directors
20th-century Polish screenwriters
Male screenwriters
20th-century Polish male writers